Tyler P. Matthews (born December 1, 1996) is an American professional stock car racing driver. He last competed part-time in the NASCAR Xfinity Series, driving the No. 15 Chevrolet Camaro for JD Motorsports.

Racing career

Camping World Truck Series
On January 28, 2018, it was announced that Matthews would drive part-time for MDM Motorsports in the NASCAR Camping World Truck Series, driving the No. 99 truck. He finished 21st in his only start for the MDM team.

Later in the 2018 season, Matthews ran the No. 83 for MB Motorsports at Gateway, finishing 17th after avoiding some of the chaos late in the going. He ran Kentucky in the No. 83 for Copp Motorsports in a partnership with NextGen Motorsports, wrecking on the first lap and finishing last.

Xfinity Series
In April 2019, Matthews joined JD Motorsports for his NASCAR Xfinity Series debut in the ToyotaCare 250 at Richmond Raceway. He finished two laps down, in 24th place.

Motorsports career results

NASCAR
(key) (Bold – Pole position awarded by qualifying time. Italics – Pole position earned by points standings or practice time. * – Most laps led.)

Xfinity Series

Camping World Truck Series

 Season still in progress
 Ineligible for series points

References

External links
 

Living people
NASCAR drivers
1996 births
People from Richlands, North Carolina